The Muse Inspiring the Poet is a 1909 oil-on-canvas painting by the French artist Henri Rousseau, forming a double portrait of Marie Laurencin and Guillaume Apollinaire. Owned for a time by Paul Rosenberg, it is now in the Kunstmuseum Basel. Another version of the work is now in the Pushkin Museum in Moscow.

References

Paintings by Henri Rousseau
1909 paintings
Paintings in the collection of the Kunstmuseum Basel
Paintings in the collection of the Pushkin Museum